Truth in Advertising is a 1997 EP by Negativland. It was released as a teaser for their up-coming album "Dispepsi". Some of the material on the EP dates as far back as 1987, where it was used on Over the Edge, the radio show masterminded by former Negativland band member Don Joyce.

Track listings
 "Truth In Advertising" - 3:17
 "Greatest Taste Around" - 2:16
 "Taste In Mind" - 1:40

Personnel

Mark Hosler - tapes, electronics, rhythms, Booper, clarinet, organ, viola, loops, guitar, etc.
Richard Lyons - tapes, electronics, rhythms, Booper, clarinet, organ, viola, loops, guitar, etc.
David Wills - synthesizer, voice, tape
Peter Dayton - guitars, viola
W. M. Kennedy - guitar

References

1997 EPs
Negativland EPs